The 2022 Birmingham Bowl was a college football bowl game played on December 27, 2022, at Protective Stadium in Birmingham, Alabama. The 16th annual Birmingham Bowl, the game featured Coastal Carolina of the Sun Belt Conference and East Carolina of the American Athletic Conference. The game began at 5:50 p.m. CST and was aired on ESPN. It was one of the 2022–23 bowl games concluding the 2022 FBS football season. Sponsored by ticket sales company TicketSmarter, the game was officially known as the TicketSmarter Birmingham Bowl.

Teams
This was the first time that Coastal Carolina and East Carolina faced each other.

Coastal Carolina

Coastal Carolina compiled a 9–2 regular season record, 6–2 in conference play. They had a non-conference game against Virginia canceled. The Chanticleers qualified for the Sun Belt Conference Championship Game, which they lost to Troy, thus entered the bowl with a 9–3 overall record. Coastal Carolina did not face any ranked opponents during the season.

East Carolina

East Carolina played to a 7–5 regular-season record, 4–4 in conference play. They faced one ranked opponent during the season, losing to NC State in their first game. The Pirates played in, and lost, the January 2015 edition of the Birmingham Bowl. They also played in, and lost, the December 2006 edition of the game, when it was known as the PapaJohns.com Bowl. They played in the 2022 Birmingham Bowl and defeated Coastal Carolina University, securing their first bowl victory since 2013.

Officials 
The officials for the game were from the Big 12 Conference and were:

Referee: Tutashinda Salaam

Umpire: Sheldon Davis

Head Line Judge: Bradford Edwards

Line Judge: David Young

Field Judge: Ed Vinzant

Side Judge: Rick Ockey

Back Judge: Joel Wetzel

Center Judge: Darren Winkley

Alternate: Marvel July

Replay Official: Dee Anderson

Communicator: Terry Porter

Game summary

Statistics

References

Birmingham Bowl
Birmingham Bowl
Birmingham Bowl
Birmingham Bowl
Coastal Carolina Chanticleers football bowl games
East Carolina Pirates football bowl games